Manuel Esteban Ancízar Basterra (25 December 1812 — 21 May 1882) was a Colombian lawyer, writer, and journalist. He founded a publishing house and a newspaper before joining the Chorographic Commission in 1850. He also served as the 4th Secretary of Foreign Affairs of the Granadine Confederation, and as the first dean of the National University of Colombia.

Personal life
Manuel Esteban was born on 25 December 1812 in Fontibon, Bogotá to José Francisco Ancízar y Zabaleta, Spaniard native of Navarre, and Juana Bernarda Basterra y Abaurrea, Spaniard native of Biscay. In 1819 his father, who had served as Corregidor of Zipaquirá under the Viceroy of New Granada, Juan José de Sámano y Uribarri; during the time of the Reconquista, was forced to flee the capital when the Spanish forces fell at the Battle of Boyacá and the victorious forces of General Simón Bolívar entered the capital. The family arrived in Cartagena de Indias, three of Manuel's siblings died in the arduous journey; in 1821 they had to flee again when this Spanish bastion fell to the forces of Admiral José Prudencio Padilla López. The Ancízar Basterra family landed this time in Cuba, a safe Spanish colony, where they remained under much impoverished circumstances as refugees; his mother and his only remaining sibling died few years after. In 1832 he graduated from the University of Saint Jerome in Civil Law, and two years later received his degree in Canon Law. On 4 July 1857 he married Agripina Samper Agudelo, sister of José María and Miguel Samper Agudelo, both writers and prominent politicians in Colombia; together they had five children: Roberto, Pablo, Inés, Jorge, and Manuel.

Selected works

References

Further reading

1812 births
1882 deaths
People from Bogotá
Colombian people of Basque descent
Samper family
University of Havana alumni
Colombian philosophers
19th-century Colombian lawyers
Colombian ethnographers
Colombian journalists
Male journalists
Colombian newspaper founders
Ambassadors of Colombia to Venezuela
Secretaries of Foreign Affairs of the Granadine Confederation
Burials at Central Cemetery of Bogotá
South American social liberals
19th-century philosophers
19th-century journalists
19th-century male writers